Vladyslav Hevlych; Vladislav Gevlich (born 23 September 1994) is a Ukrainian (until 2014), Russian football midfielder who plays for Sevastopol.

Career
Hevlych is a product of the Youth Sport School Sevastopol system. His first trainer was Viktor Tkachenko. After playing for all FC Sevastopol team levels, he signed a contract with this club.

After the annexation of Crimea to Russia, he received Russian citizenship as Vladislav Gevlich.

References

External links 
 
 
 
 Profile at Crimean Football Union

1994 births
Living people
Sportspeople from Sevastopol
Ukrainian footballers
Naturalised citizens of Russia
Russian footballers
Association football midfielders
Ukrainian expatriate footballers
Ukrainian expatriate sportspeople in Belarus
Expatriate footballers in Belarus
Ukrainian Premier League players
Ukrainian First League players
Belarusian Premier League players
Crimean Premier League players
FC Sevastopol players
FC Sevastopol-2 players
FC Sevastopol (Russia) players
FC Ternopil players
FC Dnepr Mogilev players